Kheshti castle Or Sizan castle is a historical castle located in Aran va Bidgol County in Isfahan Province, The longevity of this fortress dates back to the Seljuk Empire, Timurid Empire and Safavid Empire.

References 

Castles in Iran
Seljuk castles
]